

Mental Health Provisions in the No Child Left Behind 

As a part of the No Child Left Behind Act of 2002, congress passed into law two subparts of Part D of Title V (Promoting Informed Parental Choice and Innovative Programs) of that Act pertaining to mental health interventions as they relate to students. Those subparts are Subpart 2, Section 5241: Elementary and Secondary School Counseling Programs   and Subpart 14, Section 5541: Grants for the Integration of Schools and Mental Health Systems   and Section 5542: Promotion of School Readiness through Early Childhood Emotional and Social Development.

Subpart 2, Section 5241: Elementary and Secondary School Counseling Programs 

This section authorizes the Secretary of Education to award grants to local education agencies (LEA) for the purposes of establishing or expanding counseling services for students in both elementary and secondary school settings. This section also delineates the conditions under which LEAs should be given special consideration by the Secretary of Education. Those conditions are: 
	
 Demonstration of great need (determined in part by student to counselor, student to social worker and student to school psychologist ratios).
 Proposal of especially innovative or promising programs.
 Demonstration of great possibility for replication and dissemination.
 
This section also requires that the counseling services for which funds are provided follow certain guidelines. Those guidelines include requirements such as assurances that funds will be spent on programs that will be comprehensive in their approach, serve the needs of all students, increase the availability of services, employ qualified professionals, involve families and communities, evaluate the outcomes of the programs and show an innovative approach to providing services. The section also requires that the office of the Secretary of Education must make a report evaluating the programs that receive funds under the section.

Subpart 14, Section 5541: Grants for the Integration of Schools and Mental Health Systems 

This section gives the Secretary of Education authority to award grants to and enter into contracts with a Local Education Agency, State Education Agency and Indian tribe to support programs that expand student access to mental health care through the creation of innovative links between schools and the community mental system. These grants are awarded based on an application process. The section limits these grants to a five-year period and requires that the funds be used by LEAs, SEAs and Indian tribes to expand or improve care for students as well as to provide training for school based and community based professionals (both educators and mental health service providers), consultation and technical assistance for schools and agencies, coordination of services that will fit students' language and cultural background, and evaluation of the programs for which grant money is provided.

Section 5542: Promotion of School Readiness through Early Childhood Emotional and Social Development 

This section gives the Secretary of Education the authority to make Foundations for Learning Grants to LEAs and other local, community-based organizations (such as councils or non profits) whose mission is to assist students in preparation for school. These grants are application based and required to be directed toward programs that help students to develop emotionally, socially and behaviorally; programs that help to coordinate families working with community-based programs that provide such services; programs that provide other services that support such community-based programs such as transportation services; programs that evaluate the success of such programs, or to provide funding for students to participate in or be evaluated for eligibility for such programs. Other requirements for these grants include that programs must not also be receiving funds from other sources and that the office of the Secretary of Education must evaluate or contract for an outside evaluation for each program that receives a grant.

Context for the Provisions 

In an article about the connections between school mental health services and No Child Left Behind from November 2006, Brian P. Daly et al. cited a National Institute of Mental Health study that found that between 5% and 9% of students face emotional and behavioral issues that impede their learning.  Beyond this, a report by the Centers for Disease Control and Prevention on the interaction between school policies and health for adolescents noted in 2008 that some twenty percent of students annually demonstrate evidence of experiencing a mental health issue.  Additionally, the Department of Education, in its application materials for its program of Grants for the Integration of Schools and Mental Health Systems, notes that the majority of mental, emotional and behavior disorders have their foundation in childhood or adolescence. They report that more than half of adults who have experienced a mental, emotional or behavioral disorder claim that it began during those early years and that by the age of sixteen nearly forty percent of children and young adults have experienced a psychiatric disorder.  Furthermore, the Department of Education reports that mental health concerns overlap with and in many cases undergird other important themes in education today, such as bullying. In their Introduction, the Department of Education cites one study that showed that both perpetrators and victims of incidences of bullying were twice as likely to report symptoms of depression than other students.

In its report on the interaction of school policy and health issues for adolescents, the CDC notes that the state of mental health systems treatment in schools or coordinated by schools is much more extensive today than it once was. It notes that while in the past such services had been given to students in Special Education, one report by Substance Abuse and Mental Health Services Administration found through surveys that virtually all schools surveyed had at least one professional on staff to provide mental health services and that upwards of eighty percent of the schools surveyed provided mental health and related behavioral and crisis intervention assessments. Additionally, the American Counseling Association (ACA) reports that while in 1998 the ratio of students to counselors in schools was 561 to 1, but that by 2008-9 that ratio had lessened to 457:1.

Despite this progress, the system is still seen as inadequate in many ways by major evaluations of the mental health system. In 2002, the President's New Freedom Commission on Mental Health evaluated the current system of mental health in the United States. The commission concluded that there were "unmet needs and that many barriers impede care for people with mental illnesses."  Furthermore, in an article regarding the role of schools in mental health services, Sharon Hoover Stephan et al. report that the number of people who seek treatment for mental health disorders is fewer than 30%.  Finally, despite improvement in the rations of students to counselors in schools, the 2008-9 ratio of 457:1 still greatly exceeds the ration recommended by the ACA, which is 250:1

References

United States federal education legislation